The Māori All Blacks, previously called the New Zealand Maori, New Zealand Maoris and New Zealand Natives, are a rugby union team from New Zealand. They are a representative team of the New Zealand Rugby Union, and a prerequisite for playing is that the player has Māori whakapapa (genealogy). In the past this rule was not strictly applied; non–Māori players who looked Māori were often selected in the team. These included a few Pacific island players and a couple of African descent. Today all players have their ancestry verified before selection in the team.

The team's first match was in 1888 against Hawke's Bay. This was followed by a tour of Europe in 1888 and 1889 where the team played their first games against national teams, beating Ireland in Dublin before losing to Wales and England. Their early uniforms consisted of a black jersey with a silver fern and white knickerbockers. The New Zealand Māori perform a haka—a Māori challenge or posture dance—before each match. The haka was later adopted by the New Zealand national team, the All Blacks, as were their black shirts. In 2001, the Māori first performed the "Timatanga" haka, which describes the evolution of life and the creation of New Zealand from the four winds.

Since being given official status in 1910, the New Zealand Māori have selected some of rugby union's great players, including fullback George Nēpia who played 46 games for New Zealand from 1924 to 1930, halfback Sid Going who played 86 matches for his country and former New Zealand captain Tane Norton, who represented New Zealand in 61 games, including 27 tests, and later became president of the New Zealand Rugby Union.

History

Beginning 

The 1888–1889 New Zealand Native football team organised by Joseph Warbrick toured New Zealand, Australia, England, Ireland, Scotland and Wales. The team became the first New Zealand side to perform a haka during its match v Surrey, and also the first to wear an all black uniform. It was a wholly private endeavour, not organised by the NZRU.

The first New Zealand Māori team given official status was selected in 1910. That year the team toured New Zealand and Australia, playing a range of combined New Zealand provinces and Australian state teams. An American Universities squad was touring Australia at the same time and two fixtures were against the New Zealand Maoris. Both were played at Sydney and were won by the New Zealanders 14-11 and 21-3 respectively. In their 19 total matches played they won 12, drew 3 and lost 4 games.

The New Zealand Maoris had not played a match outside New Zealand or Australia until 1926, when they undertook a European tour of France, England and Wales. They also played two games in New Zealand before they left, two more in Australia on the way, and also stopped in Sri Lanka for one game before travelling to France to start the European fixtures. On the return to New Zealand they stopped in Victoria, Australia for a final game in which they won 41–3. In all there were 40 games played. The New Zealand Maoris won 30 of those, drew 2 and lost 8. Full-back George Nēpia remains the most notable player of that period.

Māori players and South Africa 

New Zealand has a long history of sporting contact with South Africa, especially in rugby union. Until the 1970s, this involved discrimination against Māori players, since the segregationist laws in South Africa for most of the twentieth century did not allow people of different races to play sport together. South African officials requested that Māori players not be included in teams which toured the country. Despite some of New Zealand's best players being Māori, this was agreed to, and Māori players were excluded from the first three tours of South Africa by New Zealand, in 1928, 1949 and 1960.

Nonetheless, in the early period of apartheid, during their 1956 tour South Africa did play the Māoris in New Zealand. In April 2010 Muru Walters said that in 1956 Ernest Corbett, Minister of Māori Affairs, had told the team to deliberately lose to the Springboks "for the future of rugby". The Māoris lost 37–0. This was followed by Walters calling for the New Zealand government to apologise for the way it treated Māori rugby players.

Professional era 

The professional era in rugby union began in 1995. The team lost only four of its 26 games played between 1994 and 2004, including beating England, Argentina, Scotland and Fiji. The Māori continued their winning form in 2004 beating the England Saxons in extra time in the final of the Churchill Cup in Canada.

One of their two annual tournaments is the Pacific Nations Cup, a competition involving the Pacific top national teams. From 2008 they replaced the Junior All Blacks, and they were undefeated champions, narrowly beating Australia A in the final game of the tournament. The Churchill Cup was another, which they won in 2004 and in 2006, defeating Ireland A and the USA in pool play in Santa Clara, California and Scotland A in the final in Edmonton, Alberta.

In 2005 the Māori beat the British & Irish Lions for the first time in an official match. Their preparations for this match caused them to withdraw from the 2005 Churchill Cup. In August 2012, the NZRU announced the Māori All Blacks would play three matches in the United Kingdom, including a fixture against Canada. Jamie Joseph was coach with assistance from Daryl Gibson.

In matches in New Zealand in 2010 to mark one hundred years of the team, they defeated Ireland and England.

The team was renamed the Māori All Blacks in 2012, having previously been called the New Zealand Maori and New Zealand Maoris. Many members have gone on to play for New Zealand.

Haka

One of the New Zealand Natives' legacies was the haka, a traditional Māori posture dance with vigorous movements and stamping of the feet, to the accompaniment of rhythmically shouted words; this was first performed during a match on 3 October 1888 against Surrey in England, United Kingdom. The haka was later adopted by the New Zealand national team, the All Blacks.

In 2001, the Māori first performed the "Timatanga" haka, which describes the evolution of life and the creation of New Zealand from the four winds. This was written especially for the New Zealand Maori team by team kaumātua (elder) Whetu Tipiwai. It tells the Maori story of the creation from the void, the nothingness, the darkness to what we have today. It also tells of a gathering of young warriors, young chiefs, young rugby players who are making a statement and setting aims, objectives and strategies to achieve matauranga (knowledge), whanaunatanga (unity) and taumatatanga (excellence).

Matches against international sides
New Zealand Māori matches against international sides, including the New Zealand Natives 1888 and 1889 tour. These results are only against full international sides, including the British & Irish Lions, but not against second national teams.

Overall

Updated: 12 July 2022

Players

Current squad
On 15 June 2022, Clayton McMillan named a 28-man squad for a two-match series against Ireland.

On 22 June, a further three players were added to the squad; Cullen Grace, Max Hicks and Sam Nock.

Note: Bold denotes players who are internationally capped, Caps correct as of 15 June 2022

Notable players 

 Ben Afeaki
 Stephen Bachop
 Kurt Baker
 Norm Berryman
 Daniel Braid
 Zinzan Brooke
 Tony Brown
 Bill Bush
 Adrian Cashmore
 Dane Coles
 Colin Cooper
 Ron Cribb
 Christian Cullen
 Aled de Malmanche
 Elliot Dixon
 Jason Eaton
 Hika Elliot
 Tamati Ellison
 Greg Feek
 Ross Filipo
 Troy Flavell
 Riki Flutey
 Corey Flynn
 Hosea Gear
 Rico Gear
 Sid Going
 Jono Gibbes
 Daryl Gibson
 Jamison Gibson-Park
 Zac Guildford
 Kane Hames
 Carl Hayman
 Jackson Hemopo
 Norm Hewitt
 Gavin Hill
 Stan Hill
 Jarrad Hoeata
 Marty Holah
 Akira Ioane
 Rieko Ioane
 Glen Jackson
 Cory Jane
 Tawera Kerr-Barlow
 Tanerau Latimer
 Tasesa Lavea
 James Lowe
 Leon MacDonald
 Sean Maitland
 Deacon Manu
 Hoani Matenga
 Luke McAlister
 Damian McKenzie
 Liam Messam
 Nehe Milner-Skudder
 Joe Moody
 Waka Nathan
 George Nēpia
 Charlie Ngatai
 Ryan Nicholas
 Glen Osborne
 Caleb Ralph
 Taine Randell
 Roger Randle
 Isaac Ross
 Eric Rush
 Buck Shelford
 Aaron Smith
 Johnny Smith
 Carlos Spencer
 Liam Squire
 Te Toiroa Tahuriorangi
 Codie Taylor
 Blade Thomson
 John Timu
 Paul Tito
 Quinn Tupaea
 Scott Waldrom
 Thomas Waldrom
 Joe Webber
 Brad Weber
 Piri Weepu

See also
 New Zealand Māori rugby league team
 New Zealand Māori cricket team

References

External links

 Official website
 Rugby Database Profile
 Rugby Union Football – History An Encyclopedia of New Zealand 1966

 
International rugby union teams
Maori
Rugby union and apartheid